Sergei Kuzmin may refer to:

 Sergei Kuzmin (footballer) (born 1967), retired Russian footballer
 Sergei Kuzmin (boxer) (born 1987), Russian boxer
 Sergey Kuzmin (cyclist), Kazakhstani cyclist